Shimanto, Kōchi refers the following municipalities within Kōchi Prefecture.
 Shimanto, Kōchi (city)
 Shimanto, Kōchi (town), a town in Takaoka District